Christianity is a minority religion in Sri Lanka. It was introduced to the island in first century. Traditionally, after Thomas the Apostle's visit in Kerala in AD 52, Christianity is said to have been introduced to Sri Lanka because of its close geographical and commercial ties.

Records suggest that St. Thomas Christians and Nestorian Christians lived in Sri Lanka, and the Anuradhapura cross is one of the archaeological finds that suggest Christianity in Sri Lanka before the arrival of the Portuguese. Nestorian Christianity is said to have thrived in Sri Lanka with the patronage of King Dathusena during the 5th century. There are mentions of involvement of Persian Christians with the Sri Lankan royal family during the Sigiriya Period. Over seventy-five ships carrying Murundi soldiers from Mangalore are said to have arrived in the Sri Lankan town of Chilaw most of whom were Christians. King Dathusena's daughter was married to his nephew Migara who is also said to have been a Nestorian Christian, and a commander of the Sinhalese army. Maga Brahmana, a christian priest of Persian origin is said to have provided advice to King Dathusena on establishing his palace on the Sigiriya Rock. 
The Anuradhapura Cross discovered in 1912 is also considered to be an indication of a strong Nestorian Christian presence in Sri Lanka between the 3rd and 10th century in the then capital of Anuradhapura of Sri Lanka.
There were also conversions by the Dutch in the 17th century.

The Christian population of Sri Lanka includes members of Burghers, Sinhalese and Tamil ethnic groups.

Catholicism 

In the pre-colonial era, Nestorian Christians and  St. Thomas Christians were both present in Sri Lanka. These two groups later established a union with the Catholic Church. After Yahballaha III, the Nestorians accepted union with the Catholic Church. Father Jordanus arrived in Sri Lanka in 1329 and Giovanni de Marignolli arrived as Papal Legate in 1348/49 to assist the Christians in the country. There were also Catholic travellers such as Odoric of Pordenone who visited Sri Lanka.

Catholicism was formally introduced by the Portuguese in 1505. 6.19% of the population (1,261,194 persons) is Catholic, according to the 2012 census. Catholicism thus constitutes approximately 83.5% of the Christian population as of census day 2012.

Catholicism was first introduced by the Portuguese, who left a notable mark in that Portuguese surnames are still used by many Catholics. Dutch missionaries tried to spread Protestantism after the Portuguese were expelled, but most Sri Lankan Christians are now Catholics. There is a archbishop and 11 other bishops.
The dioceses are:
 Archdiocese of Colombo
 Diocese of Anuradhapura
 Diocese of Badulla
 Diocese of Batticaloa
 Diocese of Chilaw
 Diocese of Galle
 Diocese of Jaffna
 Diocese of Kandy
 Diocese of Kurunegala
 Diocese of Mannar
 Diocese of Ratnapura
 Diocese of Trincomalee

Protestantism 

290,967 persons in Sri Lanka (1.43%) are Protestants as per the 2012 census. The Ceylon Pentecostal Mission has about 16,500 church members and 70 churches (faith homes) in Sri Lanka. About 2000 people (1998) are affiliated with congregations belonging to the Baptist World Alliance. The Lanka Lutheran Church has about 1,200 members. The Church of Jesus Christ of Latter-day Saints claims 1,200 members in Sri Lanka.

The main Protestant churches in Sri Lanka are Anglican, Methodist, Baptist and Salvation Army. The Church of Ceylon is an extra-provincial Anglican church, and the Church of South India (a united church of Anglicans, Presbyterians, and other Protestants) is a full member of the Anglican Communion and has a diocese in Jaffna. The Anglican Church has a strong effect on people in some areas. Methodist missionaries established 187 schools of which only 2 remains (Wesley College and Methodist College) because all the other schools were taken over by the government. Methodism has over 40,000 followers in Sri Lanka with 45 circuits, 200 churches and 120 pastors. Moratuwa Area and Kutunayake Negombo Areas are the regions where many Methodists live. In 2005 and 2006, the Methodist Church of Sri Lanka had a very difficult time during a period of anti-Christian violence.

St. Andrew's Church in Colombo is a congregation of the Church of Scotland. For administrative purposes, it is part of the Church of Scotland's International Presbytery.

According to the 2015 yearbook of Jehovah's Witnesses, around 6,671 active members are in Sri Lanka.

American Mission 

Ceylon under the British Occupation, when the British government slashed expenditures on education on the island due to budgetary constraints, it relied heavily on Christian missionaries to carry out educational actives. A significant portion of this effort was made by the American Ceylon Mission (ACM) that was established in 1813 by Rev. Samuel Newell in Jaffna, in Tamil-dominated northern Ceylon, as part of the evangelising effort of the American Board of Commissioners for Foreign Missions.

Lutheranism 
The Ceylon Evangelical Lutheran Church is a confessional Lutheran church in Sri Lanka, and the only Lutheran denomination registered with the Sri Lankan government. The church consists of more than a dozen congregations or mission stations, mainly concentrated in the tea plantation regions of Nuwara Eliya, Central Province.

History 

Originally named the Lanka Lutheran Church, leadership of the church was assumed by missionaries of the Lutheran Church-Missouri Synod (LCMS) in 2015, and the name was officially changed to the Ceylon Evangelical Lutheran Church in February 2017.

The first pastor ordained into the CELC was Rev. P. Gnanakumar, who had served as a vicar in the Lanka Lutheran Church for more than a decade, and was ordained on 2 September 2017 by Rev. Charles Ferry, the LCMS regional director for Asia.
On the same day, Rev. Dr. Edward Naumann, LCMS Theological Educator for South Asia, launched the church's official publishing house, the Ceylon Evangelical Lutheran Publishing House (CELPH).

In October 2017 all three pastors of the Lanka Lutheran Church, Rev. Nadaraja, Rev. Arulchelvan, and Rev. Devanesanin, applied and were accepted for membership of the CELC Ministerium, bringing the total number of Sri Lankan pastors to four.

Church structure 
The CELC Church Order provides for an episcopal polity, which is not considered to be a point of doctrine, as the church works closely with the LCMS, which maintains a congregational polity. Currently no bishop has been elected, so the church is administered by the CELC Board of Directors.

Relationship with other Lutheran bodies 
The Ceylon Evangelical Lutheran Church is a member of the International Lutheran Council, but has no official relationship with the Lutheran World Federation. On 26 September 2018, the International Lutheran Council received the CELC as a full member, thus bringing international recognition to the CELC.

According to its governing Church Order, the CELC classifies all clergy of the LCMS and churches in communion with the LCMS as "recognized clergy" who are therefore granted permission to conduct Word and Sacrament ministry in CELC congregations.

See also 
 Religion in Sri Lanka
 Status of religious freedom in Sri Lanka
 2019 Sri Lanka Easter bombings
 Mannar Catholic martyrs (1544)

References

External links 
 Archdiocese of Colombo
 Open Doors Int'l, Sri Lanka
 Adherents.com, Religion by Location, Sri Lanka
 SriLankanChristians.com
 St. Andrew's Church (Church of Scotland)

 
1505 establishments in Asia
16th-century establishments in Sri Lanka